The 2021–22 La Liga, also known as La Liga Santander due to sponsorship reasons, was the 91st season of La Liga, Spain's premier football competition. It began on 13 August 2021 and concluded on 22 May 2022. The fixtures were announced on 30 June 2021.

On 24 June 2021, the Spanish Council of Ministers resolved that spectators could return to stadiums at full capacity by means of a modification of the royal decree regulating the 'new normality', in the context of the COVID-19 pandemic.

Atlético Madrid were the defending champions, having won their eleventh title the previous season. Espanyol, Mallorca and Rayo Vallecano joined as the promoted clubs from the 2020–21 Segunda División. They replaced Huesca, Valladolid and Eibar, which were relegated to Segunda the previous season.

Real Madrid secured a record 35th title with four matches to spare on 30 April, following a 4–0 victory over Espanyol.

This was the first La Liga season since 2003–04 that did not feature the league's all-time top goal scorer Lionel Messi and long time Real Madrid player and captain Sergio Ramos.

Teams

Promotion and relegation (pre-season)
A total of twenty teams contested the league, including seventeen sides from the 2020–21 season and three promoted from the 2020–21 Segunda División. This included the two top teams from the Segunda División, and the winners of the promotion play-offs.

Teams relegated to Segunda División

The first team to be relegated from La Liga were Eibar, after a 1–4 loss to Valencia on 16 May 2021, ending their seven-year stay in the top tier. The second team to be relegated were Valladolid, following a 1–2 home defeat against Atlético Madrid on 22 May 2021, in their final game of the season, ending their three-year stay in the top tier. The third and final team to be relegated were Huesca, after drawing 0–0 against Valencia on 22 May 2021 in their final game of the season, suffering an immediate return to the second division.

Teams promoted from Segunda División

On 8 May 2021, Espanyol became the first side to mathematically be promoted, assured of a return to the top flight following a 0–0 draw against Zaragoza. The second team to earn promotion was Mallorca, following Almería's 2–3 loss to Cartagena on 18 May 2021. Both teams made an immediate return to the first division after a season away. The third and final team to be promoted were Rayo Vallecano, after winning the play-off final 3–2 against Girona on 20 June 2021, returning after a two-year absence.

Stadiums and locations

Personnel and sponsorship

1. On the back of shirt.
2. On the sleeves.
3. On the shorts.

Managerial changes

League table

Results

Season statistics

Top goalscorers

Zamora Trophy
The Zamora Trophy was awarded by newspaper Marca to the goalkeeper with the lowest goals-to-games ratio. A goalkeeper had to have played at least 28 games of 60 or more minutes to be eligible for the trophy.

Hat-tricks 

4 – Player scored four goals.

Scoring 

  First goal of the season:  Carlos Soler for Valencia against Getafe (13 August 2021)

  Last goal of the season:  Jon Guridi for Real Sociedad against Atlético Madrid (22 May 2022)

Discipline

Player 
 Most yellow cards: 15
  Omar Alderete (Valencia)
 Most red cards: 2
  Jorge Cuenca (Getafe)
  Raúl de Tomás (Espanyol)
  José Gayà (Valencia)
  Hugo Guillamón (Valencia)
  Geoffrey Kondogbia (Atlético Madrid)
  Jules Koundé (Sevilla)
  Hugo Mallo (Celta Vigo)
  Iñigo Martínez (Athletic Bilbao)
  Franco Russo (Mallorca)
  Roberto Soldado (Levante)
  Mikel Vesga (Athletic Bilbao)

Team 
 Most yellow cards: 123
 Valencia
 Most red cards: 8
 Getafe
 Valencia
 Fewest yellow cards: 76
 Real Madrid
 Real Sociedad
 Fewest red cards: 0
 Real Madrid

Awards

Monthly

Attendance to stadiums

Restrictions
Due to the COVID-19 pandemic, clubs were not allowed to use the total capacity of their stadiums. According to the progress of the pandemic, the capacity allowed each month was decided by the Government of Spain, in agreement with the Autonomous Communities.

August (rounds 1 to 3): 40% of capacity allowed. Additionally, the Basque Country reduced it to 20%, Catalonia to 30% and the Valencian Community limited the attendance to a maximum of 15,000 spectators, always respecting the agreement.
September (rounds 4 to 7): 60% of capacity allowed. The Basque Country raised its own limit to 30%, while Catalonia did to 40%.
October (rounds 8 to 12): full capacity allowed, except for Catalonia and Basque Country, whose governments limited the attendance to 60%.

Average attendances

Number of teams by autonomous community

See also
2021–22 Segunda División (second tier)
2021–22 Primera División RFEF (third tier)
2021–22 Segunda División RFEF (fourth tier)
2021–22 Tercera División RFEF (fifth tier)
2021–22 Primera División (women's league)

References

La Liga 2021-22 Schedule, Squad

External links

2021-22
Spain
1